Andreja Nikl (born 5 November 1985) is a Slovenian football defender currently playing for ZNK Pomurje.

International career

Honours 
Pomurje
Winner
 Slovenian Women's League: 2012–13, 2013–14
 Slovenian Women's Cup: 2012–13, 2013–14

Krka
Winner
 Slovenian Women's League: 2010–11

External links 
 

1985 births
Living people
Slovenian women's footballers
Slovenia women's international footballers
Women's association football defenders
ŽNK Mura players
ŽNK MB Tabor players
ŽNK Krka players